MFC 27: Breaking Point was a mixed martial arts event held by the Maximum Fighting Championship (MFC) on November 12, 2010 at the River Cree Casino in Enoch, Alberta.

Background

This event featured an MFC Welterweight title fight between Douglas Lima and Jesse Juarez. It also aired on HDNet Fights.

Glover Teixeira was forced off the card due to visa problems, and was replaced with UFC veteran Rodney Wallace.

Results

References

See also
 Maximum Fighting Championship
 List of Maximum Fighting Championship events
 2010 in Maximum Fighting Championship

27
2010 in mixed martial arts
Mixed martial arts in Canada
Sport in Alberta
2010 in Canadian sports